Aydın Dikmen (born October 15, 1937 – April 8, 2020) is a Turkish art dealer who was arrested in 1998 for trying to sell Eastern Orthodox art that had been looted from Cyprus during the 1974 invasion.

During the Turkish invasion of northern Cyprus in 1974, some of the churches and monasteries in the area were looted for art treasures. Greek Cypriot authorities now suspect that Dikmen had a major part of stripping the churches of their treasures or at least selling them.

Dikmen sold thirteenth-century frescoes from the St. Evphemianos church near Lysi, Cyprus to the Menil Foundation in Houston, Texas in 1984. The Cypriot church approved the deal providing that the frescoes would be returned to Cyprus eventually.

In 1988 Dikmen, Dutch art dealer Michel van Rijn and associate Robert Fitzgerald sold four Kanakaria church mosaics to US dealer Peg Goldberg for $1 million. When she tried to sell them to the J. Paul Getty Museum in California, the museum curator contacted Greek Cypriot authorities. After a 1989 trial a federal court in Indianapolis ordered them to be returned to the Greek Orthodox Church in Cyprus. They currently reside in the Byzantine Museum in Cyprus.

In March 1998, after an 8-month sting operation initiated by Tasoula Hadjitofi, Honorary Consul of Cyprus in The Netherlands, Munich police recovered more treasures from apartments Dikmen had rented with a false names. Dikmen was arrested after he was videotaped when he tried to sell the treasures. Michel van Rijn cooperated with the police but later refused to testify against Dikmen after he had received death threats.

The returned loot included 30 frescoes from Antifonitis monastery, a mosaic from Kanakaria church and a number of icons. They were taken to the Bavarian National Museum for safekeeping before being returned to Cyprus.

References

External  links
http://www.archaeology.org/online/features/cyprus/index.html    Mark Rose,  April 20, 1998
http://www.archaeology.org/9807/etc/special.html   Mark Rose,  July/August 1998

Art thieves
Living people
Turkish criminals
1937 births